Art Museum by the Zoo is a 1998 South Korean film written and directed by Lee Jeong-hyang.

Plot 
On leave from the military, Cheol-soo arrives at his girlfriend's apartment only to find it occupied by another woman, Choon-hee. After a few days he finds out that his girlfriend is now engaged to someone else, and having nowhere else to go he ends up staying with Choon-hee. At first the two struggle to get along, but before long Chul-soo discovers that she is writing a screenplay to enter into a competition, and they end up working on a story together based on their own experiences of love, titling it "Art Museum by the Zoo."

Cast 
 Shim Eun-ha ... Choon-hee
 Lee Sung-jae ... Cheol-soo
 Ahn Sung-ki ... In-gong
 Song Seon-mi ... Da-hye

Reception 
Art Museum by the Zoo was released in South Korea on December 19, 1998, drawing a then-impressive 412,472 viewers in Seoul alone, making it the fifth best-selling Korean film of 1998.

In 1999, Shim Eun-ha won Best Actress at the Grand Bell Awards, and Lee Sung-jae swept Best New Actor awards at the Baeksang Arts Awards, the Chunsa Film Art Awards, the Grand Bell Awards and the Blue Dragon Film Awards.

Director Lee Jeong-hyang was praised for her sophisticated and detailed direction, and the film is now considered a classic of 1990s Korean cinema.

References

External links 
 
 

1998 films
South Korean romantic drama films
Films about screenwriters
Museums in popular culture
1990s Korean-language films
1998 romantic drama films
1998 directorial debut films